The 1958 SMU Mustangs football team represented Southern Methodist University (SMU) as a member of the Southwest Conference (SWC) during the 1958 NCAA University Division football season. Led by second-year head coach Bill Meek, the Mustangs compiled an overall record of 6–4 with a conference mark of 4–2, tying for second place in the SWC.

Schedule

References

SMU
SMU Mustangs football seasons
SMU Mustangs football